This list of the Paleozoic life of Utah contains the various prehistoric life-forms whose fossilized remains have been reported from within the US state of Utah and are between 538.8 and 252.17 million years of age.

A

 †Acanthopecten
 †Acanthopecten carboniferus
 †Acanthopecten coloradoensis
 †Achlysopsis
 †Achlysopsis liokata – or unidentified comparable form
 †Achlysopsis punctatum
 †Acidiphorus
 †Acidiphorus brevis – or unidentified comparable form
 †Acidiphorus brevus
 †Acidiphorus brighti
 †Acidiphorus pseudobathurus
 †Acidiphorus unicorna – type locality for species
 †Acidiphorus wahwahensis
 †Acidiphorus williamsi – type locality for species
 †Acinocricus
 †Acinocricus stichus
 †Acodus
 †Acodus similaris
 †Acontiodus
 †Acontiodus coniformis
 †Acrothele
 †Acrothele subsidua
 †Acrotreta
 †Adiantites
 †Adiantites tenuifolius
 †Aesiocrinus
 †Aesiocrinus secundus – type locality for species
  †Agnostus
 †Agnostus neglectus
 †Allorisma
 †Allorynchus
 †Alokistocare
 †Alokistocare carnatum
 †Alokistocare harrisi
 †Alokistocare idahoense
 †Alokistocare normale
 †Alokistocare subcoronatum
 †Alokistocarella
 †Alokistocarella brighamensis
 †Altiocculus
 †Altiocculus concavus
 †Altiocculus drumensis
 †Amblycranium
 †Amblycranium cornutum
 †Amblycranium linearus – type locality for species
 †Amblycranium variabile
 †Amecephalus
 †Amecephalus laticudum
 †Ameura – tentative report
 †Ammagnostus
 †Ammagnostus beltensis
 †Amphiscapha
 †Amplexizaphrentis
 †Amplexizaphrentis paucicinctus
 †Amplexizaphrentis spinulosus
 †Amplexizaphrentis subcrassus
 †Amplexocarina
 †Amplexus
 †Anabarochilna
 †Anabarochilna australis – or unidentified comparable form
 †Ananias
 †Ananias nevadensis – or unidentified related form
 †Ancillotoechia
 †Ancillotoechia perryi – type locality for species
 †Anemonaria
 †Anemonaria delicatula
 †Angulotreta
 †Angyomphalus
 †Angyomphalus regularis
 †Anidanthus
 †Anidanthus echaris
 †Anisopyge
 †Anisotrypa
  †Annularia
 †Annularia stellata
 †Annulispongia – type locality for genus
 †Annulispongia interrupta – type locality for species
  †Anomalocaris
 †Anomalocaris nathorsti
 †Anomalorthis
 †Anomalorthis lambda
 †Anomalorthis oklahomensis
 †Anomalorthis utahensis
 †Anomphalus
 †Anomphalus rotulus
 †Anthaspidella
 †Anthracospirifer
 †Anthracospirifer increbescens
 †Anthracospirifer leidyi
 †Anthracospirifer occiduus
 †Antiquatonia
 †Antiquatonia portlockianus
 †Antiquatonia sulcatus – or unidentified comparable form
 †Apachella
 †Apatognathus
 †Aphelaspis
 †Aphelaspis haguei
 †Aphelotoxon
 †Aphelotoxon acuminata
 †Apheoorthis
 †Apheoorthis melita – or unidentified comparable form
 †Apheorthis
 †Apheorthis meeki – or unidentified comparable form
 †Archaeocalamites
 †Archaeocalamites scrobiculatus
 †Archaeocothurnus – tentative report
 †Archaeocothurnus bifida – type locality for species
 †Archaeoscyphia
 †Archaeoscyphia rossi
 †Archeocalamites
 †Archeocalamites radiatus
 †Archeoschyphia
   †Archimedes
 †Archimedes macfarlani
 †Archimedes owenanus
 †Arcuolimbus
 †Arenicolites
 †Arroyocrinus
 †Arroyocrinus stokesi – type locality for species
 †Arthrophycus – tentative report
 †Artisia
 †Asaphelina
 †Asaphellus – tentative report
  †Asaphiscus
 †Asaphiscus wheeleri
 †Ascopora
 †Ascopora macellata
 †Astartella
 †Astartella subquadrata
 †Asterophyllites
 †Asterophyllites charaeformis
 †Asterophyllites equisetiformis
 †Asterophyllites longifolius
 †Athabaskia
 †Athabaskia bithus
 †Athabaskia wasatchensis
 †Athyridacid
 †Athyris
 †Athyris lamellosa
  †Atrypa
 †Atrypa hedei
 †Atrypa parva – or unidentified comparable form
 †Atrypid
 †Aulacoparia – tentative report
 †Aulacoparia quadrata
 †Aulacoparia venta
 †Aulacotheca
 †Aulacotheca campbellii
 †Aulacotheca hemingwayi
  †Aulopora – tentative report
  †Aviculopecten
 †Aviculopecten girtyi
 †Aviculopecten kaibabensis – or unidentified comparable form
 †Aviculopinna
 †Aviculopinna peracuta – tentative report
  †Aysheaia

B

 †Babylonites
 †Babylonites conoideus
 †Bakevellia
 †Baltagnostus
 †Baltagnostus eurypyx
 †Barrandia – tentative report
 †Bathymyonia
 †Bathymyonia nevadensis
 †Bathyurellus
 †Bathyurellus feitleri
 †Bathyurellus pogonipensis
 †Bathyurellus pogonopensis
 †Bathyurellus teretus – type locality for species
 †Bathyuriscus
 †Bathyuriscus brighamensis
 †Bathyuriscus elegans
 †Bathyuriscus fimbriatus
 †Bathyuriscus wasatchensis
 †Bayfieldia
 †Bearriverops
 †Bearriverops alsacharovi – type locality for species
 †Bearriverops borderinnensis – type locality for species
 †Bearriverops deltaensis – type locality for species
 †Bearriverops ibexensis – type locality for species
 †Bearriverops loganensis
 †Beckwithia
 †Beckwithia typa
 †Belemnospongia
 †Belemnospongia neofascicularis – type locality for species
 †Bellazona
 †Bellazona bella
 †Bellazona polita – type locality for species
 †Bellefontia
 †Bellefontia acuminiferentis
 †Bellefontia chamberlaini
 †Bellefontia ibexensis
 †Benthamaspis
 †Benthamaspis diminutiva
 †Benthamaspis gibberula – type locality for species
 †Benthamaspis obrepta
 †Beyrichoceras
 †Bighornia
 †Billingsella
 †Biscoia
 †Blastoidocrinus
 †Blastoidocrinus carchariaedens – or unidentified comparable form
 †Blountia
 †Bolaspidella
 †Bolaspidella contracta
 †Bolaspidella housensis
 †Bolaspidella type locality for species – informal
 †Bolaspidella wellsvillensis
 †Bolbocephalus
 †Bollandoceras
 †Bollandoceras occidentale – type locality for species
 †Bonneterrina
 †Bourbonnella
 †Bourbonnella jocelynae – type locality for species
 †Bowmania
 †Brachyaspidion
 †Brachyaspidion microps
 †Brachyaspidion sulcatum
 †Brachyprion
 †Brachyprion geniculata
 †Brachythyris
  †Branchiocaris
 †Branchiocaris pretiosa
 †Brassicicephalus
 †Breckwithia
 †Breckwithia typa
 †Brodioptera
 †Brodioptera stricklani – type locality for species
 †Bromella
 †Brooksella
 †Bucania
 †Bythicheilus
 †Bythicheilus typicum

C

 †Cactocrinus
 †Cactocrinus arnoldi
  †Calamites
 †Calamites cistii – or unidentified comparable form
 †Calamites cistiiformis
 †Calamites gigas
 †Calamites hesperius
 †Calamites infractus
 †Calamites suckowii
 †Calamostachys – tentative report
 †Calathium
 †Calathium yersini – type locality for species
 †Callipteris – tentative report
 †Callocladia
 †Callocladia jensensis
 †Calycocoelia
 †Calygirtyoceras
 †Calygirtyoceras arcticum
 †Calygirtyoceras confusionense – type locality for species
 †Camarotoechia
 †Cambromedusa – type locality for genus
 †Cambromedusa furcula – type locality for species
 †Camerella
 †Campbelloceras – tentative report
  †Canadaspis
 †Canadaspis perfecta – or unidentified comparable form
 †Canadia
 †Canadiphyllum
 †Cancrinella
 †Cancrinella phosphatica – or unidentified comparable form
 †Caninaphyllum
 †Caninaphyllum incrussatum
 †Caninia
 †Caninia torquia
 †Caninophyllum
 †Canthylotreta
 †Canthylotreta marjumensis
 †Cardiomorpha
 †Cardiopteris
 †Cardiopteris hirta – or unidentified comparable form
 †Carolinites
 †Carolinites ekphymosus
 †Carolinites genacinaca – type locality for species
 †Carolinites killarnyensis
 †Carolinites killaryensis
 †Castericystis
 †Castericystis sprinklei – type locality for species
 †Castericystis vali – type locality for species
 †Catoraphiceras
 †Catoraphiceras colon
 †Caulpsis
 †Caulpsis punctata
  †Cavusgnathus
 †Cavusgnathus regularis
 †Cavusgnathus unicornis
  †Cedaria
 †Cedaria minor
 †Cedarina – tentative report
 †Cenorhynchia
 †Cenorhynchia type locality for species A – informal
 †Cernuolimbus
 †Cernuolimbus granulosus
 †Chaenomya
 †Chaetetes
 †Chaetetes milleporaceous
  †Chancelloria
 †Chancelloria eros
 †Chancelloria pentacta – type locality for species
 †Chancia)
 †Chancia ebdome – or unidentified comparable form
 †Chanciaopsis – type locality for genus
 †Chanciaopsis heteromorphos – type locality for species
 †Chanciopsis
 †Chanciopsis heteromorphos
 †Cheilocephalus
 †Chilotrypa
   †Choia
 †Choia carteri
 †Choia hindei
 †Choia ridleyi
 †Choia utahensis
  †Chondrites
 †Chonetes
 †Chonetina
 †Chonetina flemingi
 †Choristites
 †Choristites fritschi – or unidentified comparable form
 †Choristites pavlovi – or unidentified comparable form
  †Cladochonus
 †Clathrospira – tentative report
 †Clavagnostus
 †Clavagnostus repandus
  †Cleiothyridina
 †Cleiothyridina type locality for species A – informal
 †Cleiothyridina type locality for species B – informal
 †Clelandia
 †Clelandia utahensis
 †Cliothyridina
 †Cliothyridina orbicularis
 †Clonograptus
 †Coelogasteroceras
 †Coenites
 †Colinispongia
 †Colinispongia regularis
  †Composita
 †Composita argentea
 †Composita mira
 †Composita ovata
 †Composita parasulcata
 †Composita plana
 †Composita subtilita
 †Composita trilobata
 †Composita trinuclea
 †Condrathyris
 †Condrathyris perplexa
 †Conotreta
 †Conotreta millardensis
 †Coosella
 †Coosina
 †Cordaianthus
 †Cordaianthus pseudofluitans
 †Cordaicarpus
 †Cordaicarpus binutus – type locality for species
 †Cordaicarpus cordatus
 †Cordaicarpus elongatus
 †Cordaicarpus globosus – type locality for species
 †Cordaicarpus jayshulerii – type locality for species
 †Cordaicarpus manningcanensis – type locality for species
  †Cordaites
 †Cordaites angulosostriatus
 †Cordaites principalis
 †Cordaites Sp. A – informal
 †Cordaites Sp. B – informal
 †Cornucarpus
 †Cornucarpus longicaudatus – type locality for species
 †Corynepteris
 †Corynepteris angustissima
 †Costellarina
 †Cotalagnostus
 Crania
 †Crania rowleyi
 †Cravenoceras
 †Crepicephalus
 †Crossopteris – type locality for genus
 †Crossopteris mcknightii – type locality for species
 †Crossopteris undulata – type locality for species
 †Crossopteris utahensis – type locality for species
 †Crurithyris
 †Crurithyris arcuatus – or unidentified comparable form
 †Crurithyris expansa – tentative report
  †Cruziana
 †Ctenalosia
 †Ctenalosia fixata
 †Ctenocystis
 †Ctenocystis utahensis
  †Ctenospondylus
 †Ctenospondylus casei – or unidentified related form
 †Cyathaxonia
 †Cyathocarpus
 †Cyathocarpus arborescens
 †Cyathocarpus cyatheus
 †Cybeloides
 †Cybelopsis
 †Cybelopsis speciosa
  †Cyclopteris
 †Cyclopteris dilatata
 †Cymatospira
 †Cymatospira montfortianus
 †Cymbiocrinus
 †Cymbiocrinus anatonus – type locality for species
 †Cymbiocrinus cuneatus – type locality for species
 †Cyperites
 †Cyperites bicarinatus
 †Cyrtia
 †Cyrtina
 †Cyrtorostra
 †Cystodictya
 †Cystodictya astrepta

D

 †Dalmanellida
 †Deiracephalus
 †Delaria
 †Delaria sevilloidia
 †Delocrinus
 †Delocrinus subhemisphericus
 †Deltina – type locality for genus
 †Deltina limba – type locality for species
 Dentalium
 †Derbyia
 †Derbyia bennetti
 †Derbyia crassa
 †Derbyia sulca
 †Derbyia wabashensis
 †Desmoinesia
 †Desmoinesia muricatina
 †Diacanthaspis
 †Diacanthaspis trispineus – type locality for species
    †Diadectes
 †Diagoniella
 †Diagoniella cyathiformis
 †Diagoniella hindei
 †Diagoniella magna – type locality for species
 †Diagoniella robisoni – type locality for species
 †Diaphragmus
 †Diaphragmus cestriensis
 †Dicanthopyge
 †Dicanthopyge convergens
 †Dicranocaris
 †Dicranocaris guntherorum
 †Dictyoclostus
 †Dictyoclostus burlingtonensis
 †Dictyoclostus inflatus
 †Dictyonema
 †Dictyonema flabelliforme – or unidentified comparable form
  †Didymograptus
 †Didymograptus artus
 †Didymograptus bifidus
 †Didymograptus nitidus – or unidentified comparable form
 †Dielasma
 †Dielasma formosum
 †Dielasma phosphoriense
 †Dielasma spatulatum
 †Dimegelasma
 †Dimeropygiella
 †Dimeropygiella blanda
 †Dimeropygiella caudanodosa – type locality for species
 †Dimeropygiella fillmorensis
 †Dimeropygiella mccormicki
 †Dimeropygiella ovata
 †Dimorphoceras
 †Dimorphoceras rileyi – type locality for species
 †Dimorphoceras worki – type locality for species
 †Dioxycaris
 †Dioxycaris argenta
 †Diparalasma
 †Diparelasma
 †Diparelasma pogonipensis – or unidentified comparable form
 †Diparelasma rowelli
 †Diparelasma transversum – or unidentified comparable form
 †Diphyphyllum
 †Diplagnostus
 †Diplagnostus planicauda
 †Diplorrhina
 †Diplorrhina depressa
 †Diplothmema
 †Diplothmema arnoldi
 †Diplothmema obtusiloba
 †Diplothmema trifoliolata
 †Diplotrypa – tentative report
 †Ditomopyge
 †Dolerorthis – tentative report
 †Dolerorthis flabellites
 †Donaldina
 †Dorypyge
 †Dorypyge swasii
 †Dorypyge wellsvillensis
 †Drepanodus
 †Drepanodus homocurvatus
 †Dresbachia
 †Dresbachia amata
 †Duartea
 †Duartea bruntoni
 †Dunbarinella – tentative report
 †Dunderbergia
 †Dunderbergia anyta
 †Dunderbergia bigranulosa – tentative report
 †Dyoros
 †Dyoros type locality for species A – informal
 †Dysoristus
 †Dytremacephalus
 †Dzhaprakoceras

E

 †Echinalosia
 †Echinalosia type locality for species A – informal
 †Echinaria
 †Echinaria semipunctata – or unidentified related form
 †Echinauris – or unidentified comparable form
 †Echinauris subhorrida
 †Echinoconchus
 †Echinoconchus elegans
 †Echinoconchus semipunctatus
 †Echinocrinus
 †Ectenonotus
 †Ectenonotus progenitor
 †Ectenonotus whittingtoni
  †Ectosteorhachis – or unidentified related form
 †Ectosteorhachis nitidus
 †Edmondia
 †Ehmaniella
 †Ehmaniella quadrans – tentative report
 †Ekvasophyllum
 †Ekvasophyllum inclinatum
 †Elburgia
 †Elburgia granulosa
 †Elburgia intermedia
  †Eldonia
 †Eldonia ludwigi
 †Eleutherocentrus
 †Eleutherocentrus petersoni
 †Elrathella
   †Elrathia
 †Elrathia kingi
 †Elrathiella
 †Elrathiella dugwayensa – type locality for species
 †Elrathina
 †Elrathina spencei
 †Elvinia
  †Emeraldella
 †Endelocrinus
 †Endelocrinus matheri
  †Endoceras
 †Entogonites
 †Entogonites acus
 †Entogonites borealis
 †Entogonites burbankensis – type locality for species
 †Eoastarte
 †Eoastarte subcircularis
 †Eofletcheria
 †Eoorthis
 †Eriaster – type locality for genus
 †Eriaster ibexensis – type locality for species
 †Eridopora
 †Eridotrypa
 †Eridotrypa hindsi
 †Eridotrypa subtilis
 †Erixanium
 †Erixanium carinatum
   †Eryops
 †Euconospira
 †Eukrinaster – type locality for genus
 †Eukrinaster ibexensis – type locality for species
 †Eukteanochiton – type locality for genus
 †Eukteanochiton milleri – type locality for species
 †Euloma – report made of unidentified related form or using admittedly obsolete nomenclature
 †Euloma cordilleri
 †Eumetria
 †Eumetria acuticosta
 †Eumetria costata
 †Euphemites
 †Euphemites carbonarius
 †Euphemitopsis
 †Euphemitopsis subpapillosa – type locality for species
 †Euptychaspis
 †Eurekia
 †Eurytreta
 †Eurytreta bisecta – or unidentified comparable form
 †Eurytreta fillmorensis – type locality for species

F

 †Faberophyllum
 †Falcatamacaris – type locality for genus
 †Falcatamacaris bellua – type locality for species
 †Fenestella
 †Fenestella acarinata
 †Fenestella crockfordae
 †Fenestella dissepinodaria
 †Fenestella hamithensis
 †Fenestella incipiens
 †Fenestella parallela
 †Fenestella rarinodosa
 †Fenestella regalis
 †Fenestella serratula
 †Fenestella tooelensis
 †Fenestella trifurcata
 †Fenestella utahensis
 †Fenestralia
 †Fenestralia sanctiludovici
 †Fenestrellina
 †Fistulipora
 †Forteyops
 †Forteyops sexapugia – type locality for species
 †Fusulinella

G

 †Gattendorfia
 †Genalaticurus
 †Genalaticurus genalatus
  †Genevievella
 †Genevievella granulatus
 †Girtyella – tentative report
 †Girtyoceras
 †Girtyoceras gordoni – type locality for species
 †Girtyoceras hamiltonense
 †Girtyoceras primum – type locality for species
 †Girtypecten
 †Girtyspira
 †Girvanella
 †Glabrocingulum
 †Glabrocingulum coronatum
 †Glabrocingulum granulosum – type locality for species
 †Glabrocingulum mephitifontis – type locality for species
 †Glaphyrites
 †Glaphyrites nevadensis
 †Globocrinus
 †Globocrinus bulbus – type locality for species
 †Glochinomorpha – type locality for genus
 †Glochinomorpha stifeli – type locality for species
 †Glosopleura
 †Glossopleura
 †Glossopleura boccar
 †Glossopleura gigantea
 †Glossopleura producta
 †Glossopleura prona
 †Glossopleura punctatum
 †Glyphaspis
 †Glyphaspis concavus – type locality for species
 †Glyptospira
 †Gnathodus
 †Gnathodus texanus
 †Gnetopsis
 †Gnetopsis anglica
   †Gogia
 †Gogia granulosa
 †Gogia guntheri
 †Gogia kitchnerensis
 †Gogia spiralis
 †Goleocrinus
 †Goleocrinus vadosus – type locality for species
 †Goleocrinus vedosus
 †Goniasma
  †Goniatites
 †Goniatites americanus
 †Goniatites deceptus – type locality for species
 †Goniatites eganensis
 †Goniatites sowerbyi
 †Goniophrys
 †Goniophrys prima
 †Goniotelena
 †Goniotelena ensifer
 †Goniotelina
 †Goniotelina ensifer
 †Goniotelina plicolabeonus – type locality for species
 †Goniotelus – tentative report
 †Goniotelus ludificatus
 †Gonitelina
 †Gothodus
 †Gothodus communis
 †Grammatodon
 †Grammatodon politus
 †Grandaurispina – or unidentified comparable form
 †Grandaurispina type locality for species A – informal
 †Gruntia – tentative report
 †Guizhoupecten – tentative report
 †Guizhoupecten tubicostata – or unidentified comparable form
 †Gujocardita
 †Gujocardita parviradiatus – type locality for species
 †Gunterichthys – type locality for genus
 †Gunterichthys lehiensis – type locality for species

H

 †Haimacystis
 †Haimacystis rozhnovi
 †Hammatocyclus
 †Hammatocyclus brazerensis – type locality for species
 †Hamptonia
 †Hamptonia bowerbanki
 †Hamptonia parva – type locality for species
 †Haplistion
 †Haplistion sphaericum
   †Haplophrentis
 †Haplophrentis carinatus
 †Haplophrentis reesei
 †Hardyoides
  †Hazelia
 †Hazelia palmata
 †Heckethornia
 †Heckethornia alticapitis – type locality for species
 †Heckethornia ballionae – type locality for species
 †Heckethornia bowiei – type locality for species
 †Heckethornia hyndeae
 †Heckethornia morrisseyi – type locality for species
 †Heckethornia numani
 †Heckethornia smithi – type locality for species
 †Heintzella
 †Heintzella whitneyi
   †Helicoprion
 †Helicospira
 †Hematites
 †Hematites barbarae – type locality for species
 †Hematites burbankensis – type locality for species
 †Hemiptychina
 †Hemiptychina quadricostata
  †Hemirhodon
 †Hemirhodon amplipyge
 †Hemitrypa
 †Hemitrypa reticulata
 †Hesperonomia
 †Hesperonomia dinorthoides
 †Hesperonomia fontinalis
 †Hesperonomia frontinalis
 †Hesperonomiella
 †Hesperonomiella minor
 †Heteralosia
 †Heteropecten
 †Heteropecten vanvleeti – or unidentified comparable form
 †Hillyardina
 †Hillyardina marginauctum
 †Hillyardina semicylindrica – or unidentified comparable form
 †Hindia
 †Hindia sphaeroidalus
 †Hintzecurus
 †Hintzecurus paragenalatus
 †Hintzeia
 †Hintzeia aemula
 †Hintzeia celsaora
 †Hintzeia firmimarginis
 †Hintzespongia – type locality for genus
 †Hintzespongia bilamina – type locality for species
 †Holcospermum
 †Homagnostus
 †Homalophyllites
 †Hormotoma – tentative report
 †Housia
 †Howellella
 †Hudsonospongia – tentative report
 †Huronia
 †Huronia vertebralis
 †Hustedia
 †Hustedia elongata
 †Hustedia mormoni – type locality for species
 †Hyattidina – tentative report
 †Hyolithellus
 
  †Hyolithes
 †Hyolithes comptus
 †Hypagnostus
 †Hypagnostus parvifrons
 Hyperammina
 †Hyperbolochilus
 †Hypselocrinus
 †Hypselocrinus cavus – type locality for species
 †Hypselocrinus defendus – type locality for species
 †Hypselocrinus secundus
 †Hypselocrinus superus – type locality for species
 †Hystriculina
 †Hystriculina fragilis
 †Hystriculina wabashensis
 †Hystricurus
 †Hystricurus contractus
 †Hystricurus oculilunatus
 †Hystricurus robusta

I

 †Ianthinopsis
 †Ibexella
 †Ibexella multidiaphragmata
 †Ibexicurus
 †Ibexicurus parsonsi – type locality for species
 †Iddingsia
 †Idiognathodus
 †Idiomesus
 †Illaenurus
  †Illaenus
 †Illaenus utahensis
 †Inflatia
 †Inflatia bilobata
 †Iphidella
 †Irvingella
 †Irvingella flohri – tentative report
 †Irvingella major
 †Ischyrotoma
 †Ischyrotoma juabensis
 †Ischyrotoma wahwahensis
 †Isorthis
 †Isoteloides
 †Isoteloides flexus
 †Isoteloides polaris
 †Isoxyes

J

 †Jeffersonia
 †Jenkinsonia
 †Jenkinsonia varga
 †Juresania
 †Juresania nebraskensis

K

 †Kainella
 †Kanoshia
 †Kanoshia depressus – type locality for species
 †Kanoshia kanoshensis
 †Kanoshia reticulata
 †Kanoshopora
 †Kanoshopora droserae
 †Kawina
 †Kawina webbi
 †Kawina wilsoni
 †Kazakhoceras
 †Kazakhoceras bylundi – type locality for species
 †Kindbladia
 †Kindbladia affinis
 †Kingstonia
 †Kirkella
 †Kirkella fillmorensis
 †Kiwetinokia
 †Kiwetinokia utahensis
 †Kochina
 †Kochina vestita
 †Kochiproductus
 †Komia
 †Komiella
 †Komiella ostiolata
   †Kootenia
 †Kootenia acicularis
 †Kootenia mendosa
 †Kootenia quadriceps
 †Kootenia spencei
 †Kootina
 †Kootina pectenoides
 †Kormagnostella
 †Kormagnostella advena
 †Kormagnostella insolita
 †Kormagnostus
 †Kozlowskia
 †Kozlowskia capaci – or unidentified related form
 †Kutorginella
 †Kutorginella lasallensis
 †Kuvelousia
 †Kuvelousia leptosa

L

 †Lachnostoma
 †Lachnostoma latucelsum – type locality for species
 †Lagenospermum
 †Lagenospermum discissium – type locality for species
 †Lamellispira
 †Lavadamia
 †Lavadamia joplinae – type locality for species
 †Leanchoila
 †Leanchoila protogonia
 †Leanchoila superlata
  †Leanchoilia
 †Leanchoilia hanceyi
 †Leanchoilia superlata
 †Lecanospira
 †Leiorhynchoidea
 †Leiorhynchus
 †Leiostegium
 †Leiostegium formosa
 †Leiostegium manitouense – or unidentified comparable form
 †Leiostegium manitouensis
 †Lejopyge
 †Lejopyge calva
 †Leperditia
 †Leperditia bivia
 †Lepidocarpon
 †Lepidocarpon linearifolium
    †Lepidodendron
 †Lepidodendron aculeatum
 †Lepidodendron obovatum
 †Lepidodendron volkmannianum
 †Lepidophylloides
 †Lepidophyllum
 †Lepidophyllum longifolium
 †Lepidostrobophyllum
 †Lepidostrobophyllum majus
 †Lepidostrobus
 †Lepidostrobus obovatus
 †Lepidostrobus variabilis
 †Leptaena
 †Leptalosia
 †Leptalosia scintilla – or unidentified comparable form
 †Leptanena
 †Leptomitella
 †Leptomitella metta – type locality for species
 †Leptomitus
 †Lesuerilla – tentative report
 †Licnocephala
 †Licnocephala bicornuta – tentative report
 †Licnocephala cavigladius
 Lima
 †Limapecten
 Limatula
 †Limipecten
 †Linevitus
 †Linevitus billingsi
 Lingula
 †Lingula carbonaria
  †Lingulella
 †Lingulella incurvata
 †Lingulella pogonipensis – or unidentified comparable form
 †Linipalus
 †Linipalus magnispinus
 †Linnarssonella
 †Linnarssonia
 †Linnarssonia bellatula
 †Linnarssonia ophirensis
 †Linoproductus
 †Linoproductus meniscus
 †Linoproductus ovatus
 †Linoproductus planiventralis – tentative report
 †Linoproductus prattenians
 †Linoproductus prattenianus
 †Lissocoelia
 †Lissocoelia cylindrica
 †Lithostrontionella
 †Lithostrotionella
 †Lithostrotionella americana – or unidentified comparable form
 †Llanoaspis
 †Lobatospongia – type locality for genus
 †Lobatospongia nodensis – type locality for species
 †Lochriea
 †Lochriea commutata
 †Lonchocephalus
 †Lophophyllidium
 †Lophophyllidium profundum
 †Loxonema
 †Loxoplocus
 †Lunulazona
 †Lunulazona costata
 †Lunulazona nodomarginata
 †Lyracystis
 †Lyracystis reesei

M

 †Macluritella
 †Maclurites
 †Macronotella
 †Madaraspis
 †Madaraspis magnifica
  †Margaretia
 †Margaretia dorus
 †Marginifera
 †Marginovatia
 †Marginovatia catinulus
 †Mariopteris
 †Mariopteris muricata
 †Marjumicystis
 †Marjumicystis mettae – type locality for species
  †Marpolia
 †Matherella
  †Matthevia
 †Matthevia variabilis
 †Matthevia wahwahensis – type locality for species
 †Meekopora
 †Meekospira
 †Menomonia
 †Menomonia semele
 †Menoparia
 †Menoparia genalunata
 †Metabowmania
 †Metabowmania braggi – type locality for species
 †Metabowmania morgani
  †Metacoceras
 †Metadimorphoceras
 †Metadimorphoceras mangeri – type locality for species
 †Metadimorphoceras richardsi
 †Meteoaspis – tentative report
  †Meteoraspis
 †Michelinia
 †Microcardinalia
 †Micromitra
 †Micromitra pannula
 †Millardicurus
 †Millardicurus housensis – type locality for species
 †Millardicurus millardensis
 †Millardicurus paramillardensis – type locality for species
 †Modiolopsis
 Modiolus – report made of unidentified related form or using admittedly obsolete nomenclature
 †Modocia
 †Modocia brevispina
 †Modocia laevinucha
 †Modocia typicalis
 †Modocia weeksensis – type locality for species
 †Mollisonia
 †Mollisonia symmetrica
 †Morania
 †Morania fragmenta
 †Mourlonia
 †Mourlonia venusta – type locality for species
 †Myalina

N

 †Nanorthis
 †Nanorthis hamburgensis
 †Nanorthis multicostata
  †Naraoia
 †Naraoia compacta
 †Narynella
 †Narynella sulcata
 †Naticopis
 †Naticopis altonensis – tentative report
  †Naticopsis
 †Natiria
 †Neochonetes
 †Neochonetes granulifer
 †Neolenus
 †Neolenus inflatus – type locality for species
 †Neolenus intermedius – type locality for species
 †Neolenus superbus
 †Neoprioniodus
 †Neoprioniodus scitulus
 †Neoprioniodus varians
  †Neospirifer
 †Neospirifer cameratus
 †Neospirifer kansasensis
 †Neospirifer triplicatus
 †Neozaphrentis – tentative report
 †Nephalicephalus – type locality for genus
 †Nephalicephalus beebei – type locality for species
 †Nettapezoura
 †Nettapezoura basilika
 †Neuralethopteris
 †Neuralethopteris pocahontas – or unidentified comparable form
  †Neuropteris
 †Neuropteris ampelina – type locality for species
 †Neuropteris gigantea
 †Neuropteris heterophylla
 †Nieszkowskia – tentative report
 †Niobe – tentative report
 †Nisusia
 †Norwoodia
 †Norwoodia bellaspina
 †Nothorthis
 †Nuculavus
 †Nuculopsis
 †Nuia
 †Nunnacrinus
 †Nunnacrinus olsoni – type locality for species

O

 †Obolus
 †Obolus ella
 †Odontopteris
 †Odontopteris osmundaeformis – or unidentified comparable form
 †Odontopteris subcrenulata – or unidentified comparable form
 †Odontospirifer
 †Odontospirifer type locality for species A – informal
 †Oepikodus
 †Oepikodus quadratus
  †Ogygopsis
 †Ogygopsis typicalis
 †Oistodus
 †Oistodus lanceolatus
 †Oistodus linguatus
 †Oistodus longiramis
 †Oistodus multicorrugatus – or unidentified related form
 †Oistodus parallelus
  †Olenellus
 †Olenellus gilberti
  †Olenoides
 †Olenoides expansus
 †Olenoides nevadensis
 †Olenoides serratus
 †Olenoides spencei
 †Olenoides tricephalus
  †Ophiacodon
 †Ophiacodon navajovicus
 †Ophileta
 †Opsioryctocephalus
 †Opsioryctocephalus opsis
 †Orbiculoidea
 †Orbiculoidea capuliformis
 †Orbiculoidea missouriensis
 †Orbiculoidea utahensis – type locality for species
 †Orbipora
 †Orbipora utahensis
 †Orthambonites
 †Orthambonites eucharis – or unidentified comparable form
 †Orthambonites michaelis
 †Orthambonites subulata
 †Orthis
 †Orthis subalata – or unidentified comparable form
 †Orthis subulata
 †Orthis swanensis
 †Orthonema
 †Orthonema socorroense – or unidentified comparable form
 †Orthotetes
 †Orthotetes kaskaskiensis
 †Orthriochiton – type locality for genus
 †Orthriochiton utahensis – type locality for species
 †Oryctocare
 †Oryctocare geikei
 †Oryctocephalus
 †Oryctocephalus walcotti
 †Ottenbyella
 †Ottenbyella ibexiana – type locality for species
  †Ottoia
 †Ottoia prolifica
 †Ovatia
 †Ovatia muralis
 †Owenella
 †Ozarkodina

P

 †Pachycranium
 †Pachycranium faciclunis
  †Pagetia
 †Pagetia fossula – or unidentified comparable form
 †Paladin
 †Palaeacis
 Palaeoaplysina
 †Palaeoaplysina laminaeformis
 †Palaeobotryllus
 †Palaeoneilo
 †Palaeoneilo parvaradiatus
 †Palaeoscolex
 †Palaeoscolex ratcliffei
 †Paleococrinus
 †Palmerocrinus
 †Palmerocrinus profundus
 †Paltodus
 †Paltodus jeffersonensis
 †Parabellefontia
 †Parabellefontia concinna
 †Parabolinoides
 †Paracosmetocrinus
 †Paracosmetocrinus lundi – type locality for species
 †Parahystricurus
 †Parahystricurus bispicatus
 †Parahystricurus fraudator
 †Parajuresania
 †Parajuresania nebrascensis
 †Parallelodon
 †Parapilekia – tentative report
 †Paraplethopeltis
 †Paraplethopeltis genacurvus
 †Paraplethopeltis genarectus
 †Parkaspis
 †Parkaspis drumensis
 †Peelerophon – tentative report
  †Pelagiella
 †Peniculauris
 †Peniculauris bassi
 †Peniculauris ivesi
 †Penniretepora
 †Pentameroides
  †Pentamerus
 †Pericyclus
 †Permophorus
 †Permophorus albequus
 †Permophorus occidentalis
  †Peronopsis
 †Peronopsis acadica
 †Peronopsis amplaxis
 †Peronopsis bonnerensis
 †Peronopsis brighamensis
 †Peronopsis fallax
 †Peronopsis interstricata
 †Peronopsis interstricta
 †Peronopsis montis
 †Peronopsis scutalis
 †Peronopsis segmenta
 †Peronopsis sermenta
 †Perspicaris
 †Perspicaris ellipsopelta
 †Petasmatherus
 †Petasmatherus type locality for species A – informal
 †Petigurus
 †Petigurus inexpectatus
 †Pharkidonotus
 †Pharkidonotus percarinatus
 †Phillipsia
 †Phosphannulus
 †Phrenophoria
 †Phrenophoria type locality for species A – informal
 †Phricodothyris
  †Phyllograptus
 †Pilekia
 †Pilekia trio – tentative report
 Pinna – report made of unidentified related form or using admittedly obsolete nomenclature
 †Plagioglypta
  †Platycrinites
 †Platycrinus
 †Platycrinus graphicus – or unidentified comparable form
  †Platyhystrix – or unidentified comparable form
 †Platyhystrix rugosus
 †Platyworthenia
 †Plectelasma
 †Plectelasma type locality for species A – informal
 †Plectelasma type locality for species B – informal
 †Plethospira
 †Pleurosiphonella
 †Pleurosiphonella virginica
 †Pliomerops
 †Pliomerops insolita
 †Polidevcia
 †Polidevcia bellistriata
 †Polidevcia obesa
 †Politicurus
 †Politicurus politus
 †Polypora
 †Polypora cestriensis
 †Polypora debilis
 †Polypora micronodosa
 †Polypora stansburyensis
 †Ponticulocarpus – type locality for genus
 †Ponticulocarpus robisoni – type locality for species
 †Praedaraelites
 †Praedaraelites loeblichi
 †Prehousia
 †Prehousia alata
 †Prehousia diverta
 †Presbynileus
 †Presbynileus elongatus
 †Presbynileus ibexensis
 †Presbynileus utahensis
 †Probolionia
 †Prodentalium
 †Prodentalium canna
 †Productella
 †Productus – report made of unidentified related form or using admittedly obsolete nomenclature
 †Proehmaniella
 †Proehmaniella basilica
 †Prohedinia
 †Prohedinia spencei
 †Prolecanites – tentative report
 †Prolecanites lyoni
 †Prosaukia
 †Protoblechnum
 †Protoblechnum bradyi – type locality for species
 †Protopliomerella
 †Protopliomerella contracta
 †Protopliomerops
 †Protopliomerops quattuor – type locality for species
 †Protopresbynileus
 †Protopresbynileus willdeni
 †Protoretepora
 †Protospongia
 †Protospongia elongata
 †Prototreta
 †Protowentzelella
 †Protowentzelella cystosa
 †Psalikilus
 †Psalikilus likum
 †Psalikilus paraspinosum
 †Psalikilus spinosum
 †Psalikilus typicum
 †Psephosthenaspis
 †Psephosthenaspis glabrior
 †Psephosthenaspis microspinosa
 †Psephosthenaspis pseudobathyurus
 †Pseudagnostus
 †Pseudoarctolepis
 †Pseudoarctolepis sharpi
 †Pseudoarctolepsis
 †Pseudoarctolepsis sharpi
 †Pseudoclelandia
 †Pseudoclelandia fluxafissura – or unidentified related form
 †Pseudocybele
 †Pseudocybele altinasuta
 †Pseudocybele lemurei
 †Pseudocybele nasuta – type locality for species
 †Pseudodoriodotis
 †Pseudohystricurus
 †Pseudokainella – tentative report
 †Pseudokainella armatus
 †Pseudomera
 †Pseudomera arachnopyge
 †Pseudomera barrandei – or unidentified comparable form
 †Pseudomera insolita
 †Pseudomonotis
 †Pseudomonotis equistriata
 †Pseudomphalotrochus
 †Pseudomphalotrochus incrustatus
 †Pseudoolenoides
 †Pseudoolenoides acicaudus
 †Pseudoolenoides aspinosus
 †Pseudoolenoides dilectus
 †Pseudopermophorus
 †Pseudopermophorus annettae
 †Pseudoperonopsis
 †Pseudorthoceras
 †Pseudosaratogia – tentative report
 †Pseudoschwagerina
 †Pterocephalia
 †Pteronites
 †Ptychagnostus
 †Ptychagnostus aculeatus
  †Ptychagnostus atavus
 †Ptychagnostus cassis
 †Ptychagnostus germanus
 †Ptychagnostus intermedius
 †Ptychagnostus occultatus
 †Ptychagnostus punctuosus
 †Ptychagnostus richmondensis
 †Ptychagnostus seminula
 †Ptychomphalus
 †Ptychoparella
 †Ptylopora
 †Ptylopora condrai
 †Ptylopora eliasi
 †Ptyocephalus
 †Ptyocephalus accliva
 †Ptyocephalus declevita – type locality for species
 †Ptyocephalus declivita
 †Ptyocephalus versini
 †Ptyocephalus vigilans
 †Pugnax
 †Pugnax utah – type locality for species
 †Pugnoides
 †Punctospirifer
 †Punctospirifer campestris
 †Punctospirifer kentuckensis
 †Punka
 †Punka nitida – or unidentified comparable form

Q

 †Quadratia
 †Quadrisonia – tentative report
 †Quadrisonia lavadamensis
 †Quadrochonetes
 †Quadrochonetes type locality for species A – informal

R

 †Ramiporalia
 †Raphistoma – tentative report
 †Raphistomina
 †Ratcliffespongia – type locality for genus
 †Ratcliffespongia perforata – type locality for species
 †Ratcliffespongia sheeleri
 †Ratcliffespongia wheeleri – type locality for species
 †Rayonnoceras
 †Rayonnoceras solidiorme
    †Receptaculites
 †Receptaculites elongatus
 †Receptaculites mammilaris
 †Receptaculites mammillaris
 †Rectifenestella
 †Rectifenestella tenax
 †Regispongia
 †Regispongia contorta
 †Remopleuridiella
 †Remopleuridiella angularis – type locality for species
 †Remopleuridiella caudalimbata
 †Reticulatia
 †Reticulatia americana
 †Retispira
 †Retispira cincta – type locality for species
 †Retispira textilis – or unidentified comparable form
 †Rhabdomeson
 †Rhabdomeson artum
 †Rhipidomella
 †Rhipidomella missouriensis
  †Rhodea
 †Rhodea vespertina
 †Rhombopora
 †Rhombopora tenuirama
 †Rhynchopora
 †Ribeiria
 †Ribeiria lucan
 †Rigbyocarpus – type locality for genus
 †Rigbyocarpus ebracteatus – type locality for species
 †Rodea
 †Rodea vespertina – or unidentified comparable form
 †Rossaspis
 †Rossaspis superciliosa
 †Rossicurus
 †Rossicurus lepidus
 †Rugatia
 †Rugatia occidentalis
 †Rugosochonetes
 †Rugosochonetes loganensis
  †Rusophycus
 †Rylstonia – tentative report

S

 †Saffordotaxis
 †Sanguinolites
 †Sanguinolites elongatus – type locality for species
 †Saukia
  †Saukiella
 †Scandodus
 †Scandodus furnishi
 †Scaphellina – tentative report
  †Scenella
 †Scenella radians
 †Schizambon
 †Schizambon obtusus – type locality for species
 †Schizodus
 †Schizodus bifidus
 †Schizodus subovatus – type locality for species
 †Schizophoria
 †Schmalenseeia
 †Schuchertella
 †Schuchertella lens
 †Schwagerina
  †Scolicia
 †Scolopodus
 †Scolopodus gracilis
 †Scolopodus pseudoquadratus
 †Scolopodus quadraplicatus
 †Scolopodus rex
 †Seelyia
 †Selenocoryphe – type locality for genus
 †Selenocoryphe platyura – type locality for species
  †Selkirkia
 †Selkirkia columbia – or unidentified comparable form
 †Selkirkia spencei
 †Selkirkia willoughby
 †Sentinelia – tentative report
 †Sentinelia draco – or unidentified comparable form
 †Septimyalina
 †Septimyalina burmai – tentative report
 †Septopora
 †Septopora ulrichi
 †Shoshonorthis
 †Shoshonorthis michaelis
 †Shoshonorthis swanensis
 †Shumardia
 †Shumardia exopthalmus
  †Sidneyia
  †Sigillaria
 †Sigillaria brardii
 †Sinuella – tentative report
 †Siphonobolus – tentative report
 †Spathognathus
 †Spathognathus cristulus
 †Spathognathus scitulus
 †Spencella
 †Spencella utahensa – type locality for species
 †Spencella utahensis
  Sphenacodon
 †Sphenacodon ferocior – or unidentified comparable form
 †Sphenophyllostachys – tentative report
  †Sphenophyllum
 †Sphenophyllum angustifolium
 †Sphenophyllum verticillatum
 †Sphenopteridium
 †Sphenopteridium dissectum
 †Sphenopteridium zaitzeffii – type locality for species
 †Sphenopteris
 †Sphenopteris diphlebia – type locality for species
 †Sphenosteges
 †Sphenosteges hispidus
 †Spinilingula
 †Spinilingula prisca – type locality for species
 †Spinofacia – type locality for genus
 †Spinofacia pectinatus – type locality for species
  †Spirifer
 †Spirifer centronatus
 †Spirifer opimus
 †Spirifer rockymountanus
  †Spiriferina
 †Spirinella
 †Spirinella pauciplicata
 Spirorbis
 †Squamaria
 †Squamularia – report made of unidentified related form or using admittedly obsolete nomenclature
 †Stenolobulites
 †Stenolobulites simulator
 †Stenolobulites sinuosus
 †Stenopora
 †Stenopora confusionensis
 †Stenoporella
 †Stenoporella mineriensis
 †Stenorhachis – tentative report
 †Stenorhachis genalticurvatus
 †Stibaraster – type locality for genus
 †Stibaraster ratcliffei – type locality for species
  †Stigmaria
 †Stigmaria ficoides
 †Stigmariopsis
 †Stigmariopsis anglica
 †Stolodus – or unidentified related form
 †Stolodus stola
 †Straparollus
 †Streblochondria
 †Strebloplax
 †Strebloplax pertusa
 †Streblopteria
 †Streblopteria montpelierensis
 †Streblotrypa
 †Streblotrypa angulatum
 †Streptelasma
 †Striatifera
 †Striatifera brazeriana
 †Strigambitus
 †Strigambitus utahensis
 †Strobeus – or unidentified related form
 †Sulcoretepora
 †Supaia
 †Supaia rigida
 †Symphysurina
 †Symphysurina cleora – or unidentified comparable form
 †Symphysurina globocapitella
 †Symphysurina illaenoides
 †Symphysurina spicata – or unidentified comparable form
 †Symphysurina uncaspicata
 †Symphysurina walcotti
 †Symphysurus – tentative report
 †Synarmocrinus
 †Synarmocrinus depressus – type locality for species
 †Syntrophina
 †Syntrophina campbelli – or unidentified comparable form
 †Syntrophina carinifera
 †Syntrophopsis
 †Syntrophopsis polita
 †Syntrophopsis transversa
  †Syringopora
 †Syringopora aculeata
 †Syringopora surcularia
 †Syringothyris
 †Syringothyris textus

T

 †Tabulipora
 †Tabulipora atacta
 †Tabulipora carbonaria
 †Tabulipora ricta
 †Tabulipora sarcinula
 †Tabulipora stragula
 †Taeniopteris
 †Talpaspongia
 †Talpaspongia clavata
  †Teichichnus – tentative report
 †Telangium
 †Telangium affine
 †Terranovella
 †Tesselacauda
 †Tesselacauda depressa – or unidentified comparable form
 †Testiispongia – type locality for genus
 †Testiispongia venula – type locality for species
 †Testispongia
 †Testispongia venula
 †Tetragraptus
 †Tetragraptus quadribrachiatus – or unidentified comparable form
  †Thalassinoides – tentative report
 †Thamniscus
 †Thamniscus raribifurcatus
 †Thamnosia – or unidentified comparable form
 †Thamnosia arctica – tentative report
 †Timania
 †Timaniella
 †Timaniella pseudocamerata
 †Tingia
 †Tingia placida – type locality for species
 †Tomagnostella
 †Tomagnostella exsculpta
 †Tonkinella
 †Tonkinella breviceps
 †Tonkinella valida
 †Torynifer
 †Totiglobus – tentative report
 †Totiglobus lloydi
 †Trace
 †Trace fossil
 †Trachycheilus
 †Trachycheilus granulosus
 †Trachycheilus whirlwindensis
 †Trematorthis – tentative report
 †Tricitictes
  †Tricrepicephalus
 †Tricrepicephalus teres
 †Trigonocarpus
 †Trigonocarpus noeggerathii
 †Trigonocerca
 †Trigonocerca typica
 †Trigonocercella
 †Trigonocercella acuta
  †Trinodus
 †Triplagnostus
 †Triplagnostus gibbus
 †Triplophylites
 †Triplophylites compressus
 †Triplophylites ellipticus
 †Triplophylites subcrassus
 †Triticites
 †Tritoechia
 †Tritoechia loganensis
 †Tritoechia sinuata
 †Trocholites
 †Trochophyllum – tentative report
 †Trymataspis
 †Trymataspis depressa
  †Tseajaia
 †Tseajaia campi – type locality for species
 †Tulepyge
 †Tulepyge tulensis – type locality for species
 †Tumicephalus
 †Tumicephalus depressus
  †Tuzoia
 †Tuzoia argenta
 †Tuzoia guntheri
 †Tuzoia retifera
 †Tympanuella
 †Tympanuella transversa

U

 †Ufimia
 †Ulrichodina – tentative report
 †Uromystrum
 †Uromystrum validum – or unidentified comparable form
 †Utagnostus
 †Utagnostus trispinulus
 †Utahacanthus – type locality for genus
 †Utahacanthus guntheri – type locality for species
 †Utahcaris
 †Utahcaris orion
  †Utaherpeton – type locality for genus
 †Utaherpeton franklini – type locality for species
 †Utaspis
 †Utaspis marjumensis

V

 †Valospongia
 †Valospongia gigantis – type locality for species
 †Valospongia gigantus
  †Vauxia
 †Vauxia bellula
 †Vauxia gracilenta
 †Vauxia magna – type locality for species
 †Verkhotomia
 †Verkhotomia plenoides – or unidentified comparable form
 †Vesiculophyllum
 †Virgiana
 †Virgiana utahensis – type locality for species
 †Vnigripecten
 †Vnigripecten phosphaticus – or unidentified comparable form
 †Vorticina
 †Vorticina vortex – type locality for species

W

 †Waagenites
 †Waagenites type locality for species A – informal
 †Waagenoconcha
 †Wahwahlingula
 †Wahwahlingula sevierensis – type locality for species
 †Walcottoceras – tentative report
 †Walcottoceras monsense
  †Waptia
 †Waptia fieldensis – or unidentified comparable form
 †Warthia – tentative report
 †Weeksina
 †Weeksina unispina
 †Wellerella
 †Wellerella osagensis
 †Wellerella tetrahedra
 †Wewokella
 †Wewokella solida
 †Wilkingia
 †Wimanella
  †Wiwaxia
 †Wiwaxia corrugata
 †Worthenia

X

  †Xenacanthus – or unidentified related form
 †Xenacanthus texensis
 †Xenostegium
 †Xenostegium acuminferentis – or unidentified comparable form
 †Xenostegium franklinense
 †Xestotrema
 †Xestotrema pulchrum
 †Xystocrania – tentative report
 †Xystocrania perforator

Y

 †Yakia – tentative report
 †Yakovlevia
 †Yakovlevia multistriata
 †Yuknessaspis
 †Yuknessaspis benningtonis – type locality for species
 †Yuknessia
 †Yuknessia simplex
 †Yunnania

Z

 †Zacanthoides
 †Zacanthoides divergens
 †Zacanthoides divergensis
 †Zacanthoides fronslicinus
 †Zacanthoides grabaui
 †Zacanthoides idahoensis
 †Zacanthoides prolixis
 †Zaphrentites
 †Zhanatella
 †Zhanatella utahensis
 †Zittelella
 †Zittelella clarae – or unidentified comparable form
 †Zittelloceras

References

 

Paleozoic
Utah
Utah-related lists